The protected areas in the Democratic Republic of the Congo include national parks, biosphere reserves, wildlife reserves, nature reserves, scientific reserves, community reserves, and hunting reserves. These areas total 324,290 km2, or 13.83% of the country's land area. Several of the country's protected areas have been internationally designated as World Heritage Sites or biosphere reserves by UNESCO, or as wetlands of international importance under the Ramsar Convention.

National parks
(IUCN protected area category II)
 Garamba National Park (5000 km2)
 Kahuzi-Biega National Park (6689 km2)
 Kundelungu National Park (8236 km2)
 Lomami National Park
 Maiko National Park (10886 km2)
 Mangroves Marine National Park (216 km2)
 Salonga National Park (17,140 km2)
 Upemba National Park (13674 km2)
 Virunga National Park (7769 km2)

Biosphere reserves
 Yangambi Biosphere Reserve (2215 km2)
 Lufira Biosphere Reserve (687 km2)
 Luki Biosphere Reserve (311 km2)

Wildlife reserves
 Bomu Wildlife Reserve (6542 km2)
 Okapi Wildlife Reserve (13,847 km2)

Nature reserves
 Abumonbazi Nature Reserve	(5726 km2)
 Itombwe Nature Reserve (6009 km2)
 Kisimba Ikobo Primate Nature Reserve (963 km2)
 Lake Tshangalele Nature Reserve (447 km2)
 Lomako-Yokokala Nature Reserve (3602 km2)
 Mangai Nature Reserve (1903 km2)
 Mangrove Nature Reserve (1000 km2)
 Ngiri Triangle Nature Reserve (5500 km2)
 N'Sele Nature Reserve (34 km2)
 Sankuru Nature Reserve
 Tayna Nature Reserve (893 km2)
 Tumba-Lediima Nature Reserve (7412 km2)

Scientific reserves
 Luo Scientific Reserve (480 km2)

Community reserves
 Lyondji Bonobo Community Reserve (1030 km2)

Hunting reserves
 Bili-Uere Hunting Reserve (32,748 km2)
 Bombo Lumene Hunting Reserve (2168 km2)
 Bomu Hunting Reserve (4126 km2)
 Bushimaie Hunting Reserve (4369 km2)
 Gangala-na-Bodio Hunting Reserve (9829 km2)
 Luama-Katanga Hunting Reserve (2308 km2)
 Luama-Kivu Hunting Reserve (3900 km2)
 Lubudi-Sampwe Hunting Reserve (3489 km2)
 Maika-Penge Hunting Reserve (1499 km2)
 Rubi-Tele Hunting Reserve (6191 km2)
 Rutshuru Hunting Reserve (661 km2)
 Swa-Kibula Hunting Reserve (1004 km2)

International designations

UNESCO biosphere reserves
 Lufira Valley Biosphere Reserve (147 km2)
 Luki Forest Reserve (330 km2)
 Yangambi Biosphere Reserve (2350 km2)

Ramsar sites, wetlands of international importance
 Lufira Basin (44,710 km2)
 Mangroves National Park (660 km2)
 Ngiri-Tumba-Maindombe (65,696 km2)
 Virunga National Park (8000 km2)

World Heritage Sites
 Okapi Wildlife Reserve (13726 km2)
 Salonga National Park	(36,000 km2)
 Virunga National Park	(7900 km2)
 Garamba National Park	(4920 km2)
 Kahuzi-Biega National Park (6000 km2)

References

 
Congo, Democratic Republic of
protected areas
Nature conservation in the Democratic Republic of the Congo
Protected areas